Whiton, also known as Mitchells Mill or Whites Town, is an unincorporated community in DeKalb County, in the U.S. state of Alabama.

History
The name Whiton was formed from a combination of "White" and "-ton," in honor of the first postmaster, P. White. A post office operated under the name Whiton from 1878 to 1905.

References

Unincorporated communities in DeKalb County, Alabama
Unincorporated communities in Alabama